The 1974–75 Montana Grizzlies basketball team represented the University of Montana during the 1974–75 NCAA Division I basketball season. Charter members of the Big Sky Conference, the Grizzlies were led by fourth-year head coach Jud Heathcote and played their home games on campus at Adams Fieldhouse in Missoula, Montana.

They finished the regular season at 20–6, with a  record in conference to win the title (by four games) and earned a berth in the expanded 32-team NCAA tournament. This season was the last for the Big Sky without a conference tournament; Montana's sole conference loss was on the road to defending champion Idaho State.

In the opening round of the NCAA tournament at Pullman, Washington, Montana surprised Utah State and won by six points. It was a homecoming for Heathcote, an alumnus of Washington State and former assistant coach, so the Griz had plenty of support in the arena among the locals and traveling Montana supporters.

With the win, Montana advanced to the Sweet Sixteen at the West Regional in Portland, Oregon, and met second-ranked UCLA. In a game that went down to the last seconds, the Bruins won by just three points; they went on to win the national championship in John Wooden's final season as head coach.

Two seniors were on the all-conference team, center Ken McKenzie and swingman Eric Hays; freshman guard Micheal Ray Richardson was honorable mention. Richardson was all-conference the next three years, the fourth overall selection of the 1978 NBA draft, and a four-time NBA All-Star.

Postseason results

|-
!colspan=9 style=| NCAA tournament

References

External links
Sports Reference – Montana Grizzlies: 1974–75 basketball season

Montana Grizzlies basketball seasons
Montana
Montana